Bryan Little (born 1987) is a Canadian ice hockey player.

Bryan or Brian Little may also refer to:

Bryan Little (baseball) (born 1959), American baseball player
Bryan Little (footballer) (born 1978), Scottish footballer
Brian Little (born 1953), English football manager and former player
William Brian Little (1942–2000), known as Brian Little, American businessman